Boyes is a family name and may refer to:

People
 Adam Boyes (footballer) (born 1990), English semi-professional footballer
 Barbara Boyes (c.1932–1981), American statistician
 Brad Boyes (born 1982), American ice hockey player
 Brian Barratt-Boyes (1924–2006), New Zealand heart surgeon
 Carrol Boyes (c.1954–2019), South African artist
 Dave Boyes (born 1964), Canadian rower
 Duncan Gordon Boyes (1846–1869), British recipient of the Victoria Cross
 Fiona Boyes, Australian blues musician
 Frank Boyes (1874–1961), Canadian politician and cheese maker
 George Boyes (1910–1986), South African cricketer
 Harry Boyes (rugby union) (1868–1892), South African rugby union player
 Harry Boyes (cricketer) (1908–1979), South African cricketer
 Jerry Boyes, American football coach
 John H. Boyes (1886–1958), New Zealand Public Service Commissioner
 John Boyes (musician) (born 1966), British musician and photographer
 Karl Boyes (1936–2003), American politician
 Ken Boyes (footballer, born 1895) (1895–1963), English professional footballer
 Ken Boyes (footballer, born 1935) (1935–2010), English professional footballer
 Morgan Boyes (born 2001), Welsh professional footballer
 Rex Boyes, New Zealand soccer player
 Roger Boyes (born 1952), British journalist
 Roland Boyes (1937–2006), British politician
 Stuart Boyes (1899–1973), English cricketer
 Walter Boyes (1913–1960), English professional footballer

Places
 Boyes, Montana, USA
 Boyes Hot Springs, California, USA

Other
 Bad Boyes, 1987 British children's television series
 Boyes (retailer), a UK retail chain
 Coope Boyes and Simpson, British vocal folk trio

See also
 Boye (disambiguation)
 Boye (surname)
 Bois (disambiguation)
 Boise (disambiguation)